The 2011 Oregon State Beavers baseball team represented Oregon State University in the 2011 NCAA Division I baseball season. The team participated in the Pacific-10 Conference.  They were coached by Pat Casey and assistant coaches Marty Lees, Pat Bailey, and Nate Yeskie.  They played home games in Goss Stadium at Coleman Field. The Beavers finished the season with a 41–17 overall record, and came in third in the Pacific-10 Conference Championship with 17 wins and 10 losses.

The team was selected to host a Regional in the 2011 NCAA Division I baseball tournament, and as such were seeded #1 in the Corvallis Regional. The Beavers won all three of their games in the Corvallis Regional and went on to play the #6 national seed Vanderbilt in the Nashville Super Regional, where they lost 1–11.

Previous season
Oregon State finished the 2010 regular season as the #8 team in the Pacific-10 Conference, and lost to the Florida Gators in the Gainesville Regional. Many players returned from last year's team to play for the 2011 team.

Highlights
The pitching staff finished the season with a team ERA of 3.14 in 2011, which is the lowest since 2005 and the second-lowest since 1979.
Six pitchers were selected in the first nine rounds of the Major League Baseball First-Year Player Draft, the most ever in Beavers' history.

Rankings

See also
Oregon State Beavers baseball
2011 NCAA Division I baseball season

References

External links
Oregon State Beavers baseball team
Pac-10 baseball

Oregon State Beavers baseball seasons
Oregon State Beavers Baseball Team, 2011
2011 in sports in Oregon
Oregon State